Anjali Kusumbe is a British-Indian biologist who is the Head of the Tissue and Tumour Microenvironments Group at the Medical Research Council Human Immunology Unit and Weatherall Institute of Molecular Medicine at the University of Oxford. She was awarded the Royal Microscopical Society Award for Life Sciences in 2022.

Early life and education 
Kusumbe completed her doctorate as a Fellow of the Council of Scientific and Industrial Research in 2012. Her doctoral research considered the contributions of cancer stem cells and endothelial cells to the progression of ovarian cancer. She moved to the Max Planck Institute for Molecular Biomedicine for postdoctoral research, where she studied the heterogeneity of endothelial cells in bone, and uncovered a highly specialised blood vessel type which helped to uncover the relationships between bone vasculature and bone ageing.

Research and career 
In 2017, Kusumbe received the Medical Research Council Career Development Award, and in 2019 she was awarded a European Research Council Starting Grant. Kusumbe studies the transport networks formed by blood and lymphatic vessels. 
She is particularly interested in how these vessels evolve over time, and how this impacts the tissue regeneration, immune cells and spread of cancer.

Her work revealed that vascular erosion characterised by the differentiation of pericyte to fibroblast is a primary hallmark of many ageing tissues. This vascular loss with ageing is organ-specific as highly remodelling tissues like the gut and skin retain vasculature with ageing. Further, her work showed that the gap junction protein Gja1 is the driver of endothelial cell ageing in the pancreas, and aged blood vessels cause the loss of beta cell proliferation in ageing islets through alterations in blood vessel-derived secreted factors. 
Her lab has proactively shared imaging tools with the scientific community and made 3D tissue maps publicly available through freely accessible open resource databases.

Awards and honours 
 2014 German Society for Cell Biology Werner-Risau Memorial Award
 2021 European Calcified Tissue Society Iain T Boyle Memorial Award
 2021 Orthopaedic Research Society Alice L. Jee Award
 2022 Royal Microscopical Society Award for Life Sciences
 2022 GOLD Award for efforts to improve sustainability and efficiency from Laboratory Efficiency Assessment Framework
 2023 British Society for Cell Biology, Women in Cell Biology Early Career Medal

Selected publications

References 

Living people
21st-century British biologists
Max Planck Institutes researchers
21st-century British women scientists
British people of Indian descent
Cancer researchers
Year of birth missing (living people)